The 2022 Havering London Borough Council election is currently taking place as of 5 May 2022. All 55 members of Havering London Borough Council will be elected. The elections will take place alongside local elections in the other London boroughs and elections to local authorities across the United Kingdom.

In the previous election in 2018, the council remained under no overall control. The Conservatives were the largest party, winning 25 out of the 55 seats with the Havering Residents Association forming the principal opposition with 17 of the remaining seats. The 2022 election will take place under new election boundaries, which will increase the number of councillors to 55.

Background

History 

The thirty-two London boroughs were established in 1965 by the London Government Act 1963. They are the principal authorities in Greater London and have responsibilities including education, housing, planning, highways, social services, libraries, recreation, waste, environmental health and revenue collection. Some of the powers are shared with the Greater London Authority, which also manages passenger transport, police and fire.

Since its formation, Havering has most often been under no overall control with no single political party holding a majority of its seats. It has also been controlled by the Conservative Party for nineteen years and by the Labour Party for three years. Local elections have seen Conservative, Labour and Liberal Democrat councillors returned, with the last Liberal Democrat councillor having been elected in 2006. The 2006 election also saw a British National Party candidate elected, and the 2014 election resulted in the election of a UK Independence Party candidate. The authority also has a long history of independent and residents' association candidates winning election, including the Havering Residents Association (HRA).

In the most recent elections in 2018, the Conservatives won 25 seats with 37.1%; the HRA won 17 seats with the one elected Harold Hill Independent Party winning one councillor who joined the HRA's group; and the Labour Party and independent residents won five seats each. The only councillor elected as an independent, Michael Deon-Burton for South Hornchurch, joined the Conservative group later in May 2021 and was named as deputy mayor of the council. The result was the only hung council in Greater London. The Harold Wood Residents Association, independent of the Havering Residents Association, formed a governing agreement with the Conservative Party on the night of the 2018 election. The Conservative councillor Damian White, who had served as deputy leader of the council from 2014 to 2018, was made leader of the council following the election.

Council term 

A residents' association councillor for Cranham ward, Clarence Barrett, died in March 2019. A by-election was held to fill his seat in May 2019, which was won by the residents' association candidate Linda van den Hende. In May 2019, a residents' association councillor for Elm Park, Sally Miller, defected to the Conservative Party.

Along with most other London boroughs, Havering was subject to a boundary review ahead of the 2022 election. The Local Government Boundary Commission for England (LGBCE) concluded that the council should have fifty-five councillors, an increase of one, and produced new election boundaries following a period of consultation. The Conservative councillor Bob Perry left his party after revealing he had secretly recorded a Conservative group meeting discussing ways to design election boundaries to be advantageous to them. In response, the LGBCE extended the period of consultation and made changes to planned ward boundaries. A three-member panel including two Conservative councillors and the independent councillor Linda Van der Hende was convened to decide whether to investigate the Conservative group leader, Damian White, over claims he had tried to gerrymander election boundaries for political gain. Reporters and the public were blocked from attending the meeting. The Conservative panel members voted to discard the complaints, against the advice of the council's director of law and governance, on the grounds that they were submitted more than ninety days after the recording had been made, even though they had been submitted shortly after the recording was published.

Campaign 
Keith Prince, the member of the London Assembly for the area, announced he was standing as a Conservative candidate in the council election. Carol Perry announced she would stand for the Havering Residents Association in the same ward as the Conservative group leader who her husband Bob Perry had recorded saying that the council chief executive had let him affect the council's submission for new election boundaires so they would be "really politically advantageous".

In March 2022, the council asked all staff to consider voluntary redundancy, aiming to remove 400 staff roles. The trade union Unison and some councillors and local residents criticised the decision, saying that current staffing levels already meant long delays before getting a response from council staff, including one resident who waited three weeks for exposed asbestos to be removed.

Electoral process 
Havering, as is the case for all London borough councils, elects all of its councillors at once every four years, with the previous election having taken place in 2018. The election will take place by multi-member first-past-the-post voting, with each ward being represented by two or three councillors. Electors will have as many votes as there are councillors to be elected in their ward, with the top two or three being elected.

All registered electors (British, Irish, Commonwealth and European Union citizens) living in London aged 18 or over will be entitled to vote in the election. People who live at two addresses in different councils, such as university students with different term-time and holiday addresses, are entitled to be registered for and vote in elections in both local authorities. Voting in-person at polling stations will take place from 7:00 to 22:00 on election day, and voters will be able to apply for postal votes or proxy votes in advance of the election.

Previous council composition

Results summary

Ward results

Beam Park

Cranham

Elm Park

Emerson Park

Gooshays

Hacton

Harold Wood

Havering-atte-Bower

Heaton

Hylands & Harrow Lodge

Marshalls & Rise Park

Mawneys

Rainham & Wennington

Rush Green & Crowlands

South Hornchurch

Squirrels Heath

St Alban's

St Andrew's

St Edward's

Upminster

Miller was a councillor for Elm Park ward prior to the election and was elected for the Hornchurch Residents Association.

References 

Council elections in the London Borough of Havering
Havering